The Baupost Group is a  hedge fund founded in 1982 by Harvard adjunct professor William Poorvu and partners Howard Stevenson, Jordan Baruch and Isaac Auerbach. Seth Klarman, who was asked by Poorvu to help run the fund, remains at its head today. Baupost Group's investment philosophy emphasizes risk management and is long-only. The firm, one of the largest hedge funds in the world, is a value investing manager. According to Bloomberg L.P., Baupost is ranked 4th in net gains since inception.

Investment strategy

Risk 
It was reported that the Baupost Group does not use leverage in its investments with the exception of real estate where for every one dollar invested the Baupost Group used one dollar of leverage.

It was reported that Baupost CEO Seth Klarman explained in a speech to MIT students that investment research driven by emotion is risky and can lead to a bad investment.

Performance 
From its founding the firm have generated an average annual return of 20%.

Investment history
With the rise of distressed debt sales in Europe caused by the sovereign debt crisis Baupost Group in 2011 opened its first international office in London to take advantage of investment opportunities in European commercial property market, corporate debt trading at distressed valuations and structured products.

Walnut Place
According to a Reuters article, which cites Bank of New York Mellon v. Walnut Place LLC et al., the Baupost Group is Walnut Place. Using a traditional hedge fund tool, legal challenges of distressed bond settlements, the Baupost Group is attempting to force Bank of America to increase its settlement of Reps & Warranties of Countrywide sub-prime bonds. If the settlement were to be increased The Baupost group stands to make gains on bonds that they bought at very low values. It is unclear why the Baupost Group did not use their real name in the suit.

Natural resource extraction in Melancthon, Ontario, Canada
In 2006 Baupost Group formed Highland Companies, a Nova Scotia-based corporation that began buying farmland in Melancthon Township, approximately 120 kilometres north of Toronto, Ontario, purportedly for the purpose of farming. Having amassed over 7,000 acres by early 2011, then being actively farmed by Highland Companies, the Company submitted an application for a 2,316-acre Amabel dolomite mega-quarry. The application has seen heated opposition, as opponents raise concerns about groundwater contamination, local heritage, food security concerns, as well as a host of ancillary issues such as truck traffic congestion, highway safety, noise and dust pollution. In November 2012, Highland Companies withdrew the application in response to that concerted community opposition.

Post financial crisis of 2007–2008
After the financial crisis of 2007–2008, Baupost Group sought to purchase insurance as a hedge against the value of money declining as a result of government intervention which was a risk researchers at the company were concerned about. To execute this, Baupost Group purchased options for five-year Treasury bonds that would become profitable if Treasury bonds dropped sharply.

Company
It was reported that in 2004, 42 employees worked at Baupost Group: 12 investment focused and 30 administrative.

Assets
Baupost Group's assets were $30 million in 1982, and $29.9 billion as of December 31, 2013.

Offices
 Boston (1982)
 London (2011)

Key people
 Seth Klarman, founder and president
 Jim Mooney, Managing Director

References

External links
 
 Seth Klarman's Baupost Hedge Fund Loses More Than $150 Million On Gold Miners
 Baupost hedge fund plans to return some money: sources 
 Complete List of Current Portfolio Holdings

Financial services companies established in 1982
Hedge fund firms in Boston
Hedge funds
American companies established in 1982
Investment management companies of the United States